Alexander Dobrokhotov (born 8 September 1950) is a Russian philosopher, historian of philosophy, historian of culture, and university professor. He specialises in the history of Russian culture, history of philosophy, metaphysics, Russian philosophy, ancient and medieval philosophy, Kant and German Idealism, and philosophy of culture.

Education
From 1967 to 1972, Alexander Dobrokhotov was an undergraduate student in philosophy at the Faculty of Philosophy, Moscow State University. From 1972 to 1975, he was a graduate student in philosophy at the Department of Western Philosophy History, Faculty of Philosophy, at Moscow State University. In 1978, he defended his PhD dissertation (‘kandidatskaya’) titled 'Parmenides' Teachings on Being’. In 1990, he defended his second dissertation (‘doktorskaya’) titled 'The Category of Being in Ancient Philosophy of the Classical Period’.

Academic life
Alexander Dobrokhotov started his academic career as a historian of Ancient Greek Philosophy and as an interpreter of Parmenides' and Heraclitus’ theories of being. His studies resulted in several books, one of which, ‘The Category of Being in Classical West-European Philosophy’ (1986), summarises his main ideas.

From 1988 to 1995, Dobrokhotov was the chair of the Department of Cultural History of the Moscow Institute of Physics and Technology. From 1995 to 2009, Alexander Dobrokhotov was the chair of History and Theory of World Culture of the Faculty of Philosophy, Moscow State University. The chair was created in 1990. Many prominent Soviet and Russian scholars like Viacheslav Ivanov, Sergei Sergejewitsch Awerinzew, Aron Gurevich, Mikhail Gasparov, Georgii Knabe, Yeleazar Meletinsky, Vladimir Romanov, Tatiana Vasilieva, Nina Braginskaia, Vladimir Bibikhin have worked there. From 1995 to 2015, Alexander Dobrokhotov taught at the Graduate School of European Cultures (VSHEK) which is an international training and research centre at Russian State University for the Humanities (VSHEK was established in April 2007 and replaced the Institute of European Cultures). From 2009 until today, Alexander Dobrokhotov is also a professor at the National Research University Higher School of Economics (HSE), at the School of Cultural Studies (in the autumn of 2020, merged with the School of Philosophy and named the School of Philosophy and Cultural Studies). He teaches various courses on philosophy, philosophy of culture, metaphysics and theology, history of Russian culture. In 2010, he became a tenured professor at HSE. Currently, Alexander Dobrokhotov is a member of the editorial board of Arbor Mundi, Transcultural Studies, and Studies in East European Thought.

Today, Alexander Dobrokhotov is a leading Russian philosopher of culture and prominent scholar in culturology. He often appears on television and has taught a massive online course on Coursera.

Philosophy
In late 1980s and early 1990s, the academic disciplinary landscape on the territory of the former Soviet Union underwent significant changes. Some disciplines based on Marxism–Leninism ceased to exist, and a number of new disciplines in the humanities and social sciences appeared. Among the new fields there was an approach towards culture within the Russian humanities which came to be known as ‘culturology’ (kulturologia). There have been many versions of this discipline, and Alexander Dobrokhotov became the founder of his own original version of culturology, based on the Kantian and Hegelian philosophical traditions and on the Russian philosophy on the Silver Age. He regards studies of culture as a combination of theoretical philosophy of culture on one hand, and empirical studies on the other hand.

In his works on philosophy of culture, he argues that ‘Culture’ can be regarded as an independent regional of being, alongside ‘Nature’ and ‘Spirit’. He defines Culture as the universe of artefacts. The artefact is the result of an objectification of Spirit and an anthropomorphization of Nature. In this respect, culture mediates Nature and Spirit. Culture makes obsolete the ontological conflict between Nature and Spirit. In their place, two other ontological conflicts appear: the conflict between Nature and Culture, and between Culture and Spirit. Alexander Dobrokhotov further argues that Culture is not a mechanism of human adaptation to the natural environment, but is rather an ontological wholeness, with its own aim setting, or, in his terms, ‘teleologism’. Pure or transcendental forms set aims for culture. This idea stems from works by Plato, Leibniz, Kant, and Husserl. Each artefact of Culture is created in order to take its place within the ontological wholeness, and thus, alongside its concrete meaning or function, it also contains a latent interpretation of the wholeness. ‘How should the world look like so that I could be a part of it?’ — this is the question which each artefact answers.

From this follows an empirical method which forms the foundation of the empirical discipline of culturology. This method involves reconstructing the ontological wholeness from the individual artefact. In other words, the method involves answering the question of how the world should look like so that the artefact could be a part of it. Furthermore, if the wholeness is the same for all its artefacts, an isomorphism of heterogeneous artefacts can be discovered. Hence, the main question of the empirical study of culture is ‘How can we reconcile the heterogeneity and isomorphism of cultural artefacts?’

In his numerous empirical studies of culture, Alexander Dobrokhotov demonstrates how his theory and method work. He reveals the underlying isomorphism in works by Goethe, Friedrich Nietzsche, and Pablo Picasso; in quantum mechanics and avant-garde in art; in the 18th-century philosophy of mind and the novel; in theology and Alfred Hitchcock’s films.

Bibliography

Books in Russian

 Философия культуры: учебник для вузов. М.: Издательский дом НИУ ВШЭ, 2016. (Philosophy of Culture. Moscow, 2016)
 Телеология культуры. М.: Прогресс-Традиция, 2016. (Teleology of Culture. Moscow, 2016)
 Избранное. М.: Территория будущего, 2008. (Selected Works. Moscow, 2008.)
 Данте. М.: Мысль, 1980. (Dante. Moscow, 1990. 208 pages.)
 Категория бытия в классической западноевропейской философии. М.: Изд-во Московского университета, 1986. (The Category of Being in Classical European Philosophy. Moscow, 1986. [Abstract in German]. 248 pages.)
 Учение досократиков о бытии. М.: Изд-во Московского университета, 1980. (Pre-Socratics' Teachings on Being. Moscow, 1980. 84 pages.)

Publications in English

 The Austrian Experience: The Mamardashvili Variant. In: Transcultural Studies: A Journal in Interdisciplinary Research. Vol. 5 No. 1 2009 [2015] Special Issue: Merab Mamardashvili: Transcultural Philosopher. Pp. 65-73.
 Descartes and Dostoyevski: two modes of ‘cogito’. National Research University Higher School of Economics (HSE). Basic Research Program. Working Papers. Series: Humanities, WP BRP 89/HUM/2015.  Moscow, 2015.
 The spiritual meaning of war in the philosophy of the Russian silver age. In: Studies in East European Thought: Volume 66, Issue 1 (2014), P. 69–76.
 The Problem of the "I" as a Culturological Topic. In: Russian Studies in Philosophy 10/2013; 52(2): P. 61-79. 
 The short happy life of Goethe's Faust, or hieros gamos as the center of the tragedy. National Research University Higher School of Economics (HSE). Basic Research Program. Working Papers. Series: Humanities, WP BRP 15/HUM/2013.  Moscow, 2013. P. 1-14.
 “GAKhN: an aesthetics of ruins, or Aleksej Losev’s failed project.” In: Studies in East European Thought Vol. 63 / 2011. P. 31-42.
 “A short course on world culture.” In: Intellectual News. 2001. No. 9. P. 50-53.
 “You know - therefore, you ought to. (Ethical Implications of the «Cogito»).” In: How Natural is the Ethical Law? Tilburg, 1997.
 “The Thesis "Soma - Sema" And Its Philosophical Implications.” In: Pythagorean Philosophy. Athens, 1992.

Publications in other languages

 Die Rezeption der klassischen deutschen Ästhetik in den Arbeiten und Diskussionen der GAChN. In: Kunst als Sprache – Sprachen der Kunst. Russische Ästhetik und Kunsttheorie der 1920er Jahre in der europäischen Diskussion. Sonderheft12 der “Zeitschrift für Ästhetik und Allgemeine Kunstwissenschaft”. Felix Meiner Verlag, 2014. S. 225 – 246.
 Le probleme du “Moi” dans la philosophie de Vladimir Soloviev et de l’Age d’argent. In: Revue philosophique de France et de l’étranger. N°3-2014. (2014 – 139e Annee – Tome CCVI)  P. 297 – 314.
 “Kants Teleologie als Kulturtheorie.” In: Kant im Spiegel der russischen Kantforschung heute. Frommann-Holzboog Verlag. Stuttgart-Bad, 2008. S. 19-27.
 “Antignostische Momente in Hegels Spekulation.” In: Die Folgen des Hegelianismus: Philosophie, Religion und Politik im Abschied von der Moderne. Hrsg. von Peter Koslowski. München. Wilhelm Fink Verlag, 1998. S. 137-146.
 “Die Evolution der russischen Henologie im ersten Viertel des XX. Jahrhunderts.” In: Henologische Perspektiven II. (Elementa. Bd. 69) Amsterdam-Atlanta. 1997.
 “La philosophie: en attendant Godot.” In: Esprit. Paris, 1996, # 22-3.
 “Das Individuum als Traeger der Macht: Destruktion der Ideale.” In: Miscellanea Mediaevalia. Bd.24. Individuum und Individualitaet im Mittelalter. Berlin - New-York, 1996.
 “Behovet av metafysik.” Ord & Bild. # 1-2. Goeteborg.1994. S. 165 - 171. 
 “Metaphysik und Herrschaft: die "Russische Idee" als Ursprung einer Kultur des authoritaeren Denkens und Handelns.” In: Studies in Soviet Thought 44. 1992. Kluwer Academic Publishers. S.11-17.
 “Mensch und Natur im "Fegefeuer" Dantes.” In: Miscellanea Mediaevalia. Bd.21/2. Berlin-New York, 1992. S. 791-794.
 “Welches sind die wirklichen Fortschritte, die die Metaphysik seit Parmenides Zeiten gemacht hat?” In: La Parola del Passato. Rivista di studi antichi. Vol. XLIII. Napoli, 1988. S. 127-142.
 “L'Etre dans la philosophie antique et l'ontologie ouest-europeenne.” In: La philosophie grecque et sa portee culturelle et historique. Moscou, 1985, p. 138-157.
 “Heraklit: Fragment B52.” In: Studien zur Geschichte der westlichen Philosophie. Fr.a.M., 1986. S. 55-71.

See also
 Aron Gurevich
 Mikhail Gasparov
 Philosophy of culture
 Viacheslav Ivanov
 List of Russian philosophers
 Philosophy in the Soviet Union
 Aleksei Losev
 Tartu–Moscow Semiotic School
 Juri Lotman
 Russian symbolism
 Silver Age of Russian Poetry

References

External links

>

1950 births
20th-century essayists
20th-century Russian historians
20th-century Russian philosophers
21st-century essayists
21st-century Russian historians
21st-century Russian philosophers
Epistemologists
Film theorists
Historians of philosophy
Idealists
Kant scholars
Literary theorists
Living people
Mass media theorists
Moscow State University alumni
Academic staff of Moscow State University
Academic staff of the Higher School of Economics
Ontologists
Philosophers of art
Philosophers of culture
Philosophers of literature
Philosophers of mind
Philosophers of religion
Philosophers of science
Philosophers of social science
Philosophers of war
Philosophy academics
Philosophy writers
Russian essayists
Soviet essayists
Soviet historians
Soviet philosophers
Theorists on Western civilization
Trope theorists
Writers about religion and science